James R. Hull (February 15, 1917 – November 2, 1991) was an American basketball forward who led the Ohio State Buckeyes to the championship game in the first-ever NCAA basketball tournament. The Buckeyes finished the season with a 16–7 record, and lost to the Oregon Ducks in the finals. Hull was named the Most Outstanding Player of that first tournament.

Hull was a two-year starter for the Buckeyes. As a senior and captain of the 1938–1939 team he was the leading scorer in the Big Ten Conference and was a consensus All-America selection.

In 1977 Hull was inducted as a charter member of the Ohio State Varsity O Hall of Fame. In 2007 he was inducted into the Ohio Basketball Hall of Fame.  He has also been inducted into the Rocky Mountain Orthodontics Dentist Athletic Hall of Fame.

References

1917 births
1991 deaths
All-American college men's basketball players
American men's basketball players
Forwards (basketball)
Ohio State Buckeyes men's basketball players
People from Highland County, Ohio